Abrham Sime (born 7 November 2001) is an Ethiopian athlete.

He won the men's 2000m steeplechase in the Youth Olympic Games 2018.

Sime was second in the 3000m steeplechase Ethiopian Olympic trials in June 2021 behind Bikila Tadese Takele with both men running personal bests, Sime ran 8:12:11 to secure his qualification for the delayed 2020 Tokyo Olympics and was chosen in the Ethiopian squad. However, Sime did not compete.

References

2001 births
Living people
Place of birth missing (living people)
Athletes (track and field) at the 2018 Summer Youth Olympics
Athletes (track and field) at the 2018 African Youth Games
Youth Olympic gold medalists in athletics (track and field)
Youth Olympic gold medalists for Ethiopia
Ethiopian male steeplechase runners
21st-century Ethiopian people